Magrath is a surname. Notable people with the surname include:

 Andrew Gordon Magrath, last Confederate Governor of South Carolina
 C. Peter Magrath, interim president of West Virginia University
 Cassandra Magrath, Australian actress
 Charles Alexander Magrath, surveyor of the Northwest Territories
 Cornelius Magrath (1736–1760), Irish giant
 John Magrath (disambiguation), multiple people
 Miler Magrath, Irish religious figure